The Life Stage: Virtual House is a construction simulation/adventure game developed by Microcabin for the 3DO Interactive Multiplayer. The player is given tools to create virtual living spaces and may also view several predesigned virtual homes. The Life Stage: Virtual House was a launch title for the 3DO in Japan.

Reception
The game was scored a total of 21 out of 40 by the four reviewers of the Japanese magazine Weekly Famicom Tsūshin (Famitsu).

References

1993 video games
3DO Interactive Multiplayer games
3DO Interactive Multiplayer-only games
First-person adventure games
Construction and management simulation games
Video games developed in Japan